Brienz/Brinzauls (Romansh: Brinzauls) is a former municipality in the district of Albula in the canton of Graubünden in Switzerland.  On 1 January 2015 the former municipalities of Alvaschein, Mon, Stierva, Tiefencastel, Alvaneu, Brienz/Brinzauls and Surava merged to form the new municipality of Albula/Alvra.

The majority of the population is German-speaking, with a large Romansh-speaking minority.

History
Brienz/Brinzauls is first mentioned around 840 as Brienzola.

By the 12th century the village was an economic center for the Bishop of Chur.  The Lords of Brienz were first mentioned as the owners of a fortified tower in the village in 1259.  The tower fell in ruin and was demolished in 1880.  Until 1851, the village was part of the Herrschaft of Belfort.  Between 1869 and 1883 Brienz/Brinzauls and Surava were united into a single political municipality.  In 1874, a fire damaged or destroyed much of the village.

The village church was first mentioned in 840.  In 1519 St. Calixtus became the patron saint of this church.  In 1526 it separated from the parish of Lantsch/Lenz to become a parish.  In 1725 Surava separated from Brienz/Brinzauls to form its own parish.

In 1870-73 the Landwasserstrasse was built which helped connect the village to the rest of the country.  Beginning in the 1960s the number of local farmers began to drop, however agriculture still remains important.  In 1990, about 43% of all jobs in the municipality were in agriculture.  In 1860 the entire population spoke Romansh.  By 1990 it had dropped to only 58%.

Geography

Of this area, 22.8% is used for agricultural purposes, while 50.8% is forested. Of the rest of the land, 2.1% is settled (buildings or roads) and the remainder (24.3%) is non-productive (rivers, glaciers or mountains).

The village is located north of the Albula River on the road from Lenzerheide to Davos.  It is a Haufendorf (an irregular, unplanned and quite closely packed village, built around a central square) on a terrace to the north and above the Albula river

It consists of the village of Brienz/Brinzauls and the hamlet of Vazerol at the Julier Pass.  Until 1996 Brienz/Brinzauls was known as Brienz (GR).

Demographics
Brienz/Brinzauls had a population (as of 2013) of 128.  , 1.9% of the population was made up of foreign nationals.  Over the last 10 years the population has decreased at a rate of -12.6%.  Most of the population speaks German (68.4%), with the rest speaking Romansh (31.6%).

, the gender distribution of the population was 50.0% male and 50.0% female.  The age distribution, in Brienz/Brinzauls is; 14 people or 12.0% of the population are between 0 and 9 years old.  8 people or 6.8% are 10 to 14, and 2 people or 1.7% are 15 to 19.  Of the adult population, 12 people or 10.3% of the population are between 20 and 29 years old.  19 people or 16.2% are 30 to 39, 16 people or 13.7% are 40 to 49, and 5 people or 4.3% are 50 to 59.  The senior population distribution is 24 people or 20.5% of the population are between 60 and 69 years old, 15 people or 12.8% are 70 to 79, there are 2 people or 1.7% who are 80 to 89.

In the 2007 federal election the most popular party was the SVP which received 50.6% of the vote.  The next three most popular parties were the CVP (30%), the SPS (12.5%) and the FDP (6.9%).

The entire Swiss population is generally well educated.  In Brienz/Brinzauls about 66.1% of the population (between age 25–64) have completed either non-mandatory upper secondary education or additional higher education (either university or a Fachhochschule).

Brienz/Brinzauls has an unemployment rate of 0.72%.  , there were 10 people employed in the primary economic sector and about 4 businesses involved in this sector.  6 people are employed in the secondary sector and there are 2 businesses in this sector.  4 people are employed in the tertiary sector, with 2 businesses in this sector.

The historical population is given in the following table:

References

External links

Albula/Alvra
Former municipalities of Graubünden